The basketball tournament at the 1955 Mediterranean Games was held in Barcelona, Spain.

Medalists

References
1955 Competition Medalists

Basketball
Basketball at the Mediterranean Games
International basketball competitions hosted by Spain
1955–56 in European basketball
1955 in Asian basketball
1955 in African basketball
International basketball competitions hosted by Catalonia